Gülbaba, historically Martavan, is a village in the Kilis District, Kilis Province, Turkey. The village is inhabited by Kurds and had a population of 871 in 2022.

The village was inhabited by Kurds in late 19th century.

References

Villages in Kilis District
Kurdish settlements in Kilis Province